Federal Highway 63 (Carretera Federal 63) (Fed. 63) is a toll-free part of the federal highway corridors (los corredores carreteros federales) of Mexico. The highway connects the cities of Matehuala, San Luis Potosí and Mexquitic, San Luis Potosí.

References

063
Transportation in San Luis Potosí